Pachydota striata is a moth of the subfamily Arctiinae. It was described by Paul Dognin in 1893. It is found in Colombia, Venezuela, Ecuador and Peru.

References

Phaegopterina
Moths described in 1893